Muckatah is a locality in northern Victoria, Australia in the local government area of the Shire of Moira.

The word Muckatah means 'a little plain'.

History

The post office opened on 1 November 1881 and was closed on 30 June 1920.

Settlers arrived in Muckatah about 1876 when the area was thickly covered by huge trees. These were felled by axe, cut into lengths with a crosscut saw, shaped by broad axe and made into dwellings.

The first crops of wheat were grown on areas of up to 10 acres or so with the bags of grain carted to Benalla and later, Numurkah. A bush track was used to travel to Shepparton for mail and supplies. The earliest selections were of 320 acres. A racecourse was in use by 1895 and a golf course on the same site in later years. Some early settlers were Nunan, Noonan, Salmon, Parnell, Gleeson, Lane, Hanrahan, Charles, Jessop, Flynn, Keady, Kennedy, Dunn, Walsh, McIntyre,  Fields, Duffy and McCormack. In the early village was a hotel, post office and blacksmith.

At Muckatah, an annual St Patrick's Day Race meeting commenced in 1881, and an athletics meet in 1883, the following results were recorded:

 Running high jump J. Keating / W. Hamilton 1st. 5’3” 15/-
 Drop Kick Football P. Brown 1st. 80 Yards 10/-
 Hop Step & Jump J Keating 42’3” 10/-
 Vaulting with Pole Thomas Nunan 11’2” 10/-

A Coursing Club held its first event at Muckatah on 16 August 1890. On that day a prize of 10/- was offered to the winner.

Moire Shire Council was formed in 1994 from the amalgamation of the Shire of Cobram, Shire of Nathalia, Shire of Numurkah, and parts of the Shire of Tungamah and Shire of Yarrawonga.  Cobram's plan of an amalgamation of the five shires was accepted, but its suggested name for the newly created shire was not. 'Muckatah' was not seen as being sufficiently representative of all the amalgamating shires and so 'Moira' was chosen.

Muckatah Football Club

In 1888 the Goulburn Valley Football Association (GVFA) was formed and consisted of sides from Cobram, Numurkah, Wunghnu, Yarroweyah, Muckatah and Nathalia, with Muckatah going onto win five GVFA premierships and were runners up eleven times. They also won the two Murray Border Football Association premierships, as well as two Federal District Football Association premierships too! Muckatah joined the Katandra District Football Association in 1930 for one season only and were runners up to the Yabba Football Club.

Muckatah was one of the foundation clubs of the Murray Football League (MFL) in 1931, along with the following clubs, Barooga, Cobram, Muckatah, Numurkah, Strathmerton and Tocumwal. The Muckatah Football Club was disbanded in 1939.

E. Ted Bourke played with Muckatah prior to playing with Richmond Football Club and Charlie Fisher played with Muckatah prior to playing with Carlton Football Club.

Football Competitions
Muckatah played in the following football competitions between 1888 and 1939.

Goulburn Valley Football Association
 1888
Muckatah FC 
 1889 to 1892 - club in recess
Gedye's Victoria Hotel Trophy
 1893
Murray Border Football Association
 1894
Goulburn Valley Football Association
 1895
Murray Border Football Association
 1896
Federal District Football Association
 1897
Goulburn Valley Football Association
 1898 to 1900
Federal District Football Association
 1901
Goulburn Valley Football Association
 1902 to 1929
Katandra & District Football Association
 1930
Murray Football League
 1931 to 1939

Premierships
Murray Border Football Association
1894 & 1896
Goulburn Valley Football Association
1898, 1900, 1910, 1911 & 1912
Federal District Football Association
1897 & 1901
Goulburn Valley Football Association (Juniors)
 1912 
Runners Up
Goulburn Valley Football Association
1888, 1895, 1902, 1905, 1908, 1909, 1914, 1915, 1925, 1926 & 1927
Goulburn Valley Football Association (Juniors)
1913
Katandra District Football Association
1930

References

Towns in Victoria (Australia)
Shire of Moira